Men with Brooms is the soundtrack album to the Canadian film Men with Brooms, released in 2002.

Track listing
 Sarah Harmer with The Tragically Hip, "Silver Road" (2:48)
 Kathleen Edwards, "Hockey Skates" (4:25)
 The Tragically Hip, "Throwing Off Glass" (3:27)
 Our Lady Peace, "Life" (4:22)
 The New Pornographers, "Mass Romantic" (4:03)
 Sean MacDonald, "God" (2:34)
 Big Sugar, "Diggin' a Hole" (4:37)
 Tom Wilson, "Planet Love" (2:52)
 Matthew Good Band, "Hello Time Bomb" (3:55)
 Pepper Sands, "Can U Tell" (3:13)
 Chantal Kreviazuk, "Leading Me Home" (4:37)
 Paul Gross, "Kiss ’Til You Weep" (3:40)
 Holly McNarland, "Watching Over You" (3:44)
 The Tragically Hip, "Oh Honey" (2:17)
 Jack Lenz, "Men With Brooms Theme" (3:53)

2002 soundtrack albums